The speaker of the Gibraltar Parliament is the presiding officer of the Gibraltar Parliament, the legislature of the British Overseas Territory of Gibraltar. The current Speaker is Melvyn Farrell, who succeeded Adolfo Canepa on 19 November 2019

List
Below is a list of speakers of the Gibraltar Parliament:

A Legislative Council, the predecessor of the parliament, was inaugurated on 23 November 1950. A Speaker was appointed in 1958.

References

 
Politics of Gibraltar
Gibraltar
House of Assembly, Speakers